Drienica is a village and municipality in Sabinov District in the Prešov Region of north-eastern Slovakia.

History
In historical records the village was first mentioned in 1343.

Geography
The municipality lies at an altitude of 473 metres and covers an area of 10.217 km². It has a population of about 691 people.

Genealogical resources

The records for genealogical research are available at the state archive "Statny Archiv in Presov, Slovakia"

 Roman Catholic church records (births/marriages/deaths): 1676-1895 (parish B)
 Greek Catholic church records (births/marriages/deaths): 1846-1895 (parish A)

See also
 List of municipalities and towns in Slovakia

External links
https://web.archive.org/web/20071116010355/http://www.statistics.sk/mosmis/eng/run.html
Surnames of living people in Drienica

Villages and municipalities in Sabinov District
Šariš